Freedb was a database of compact disc track listings, where all the content was under the GNU General Public License. To look up CD information over the Internet, a client program calculated a hash function from the CD table of contents and used it as a disc ID to query the database. If the disc was in the database, the client was able to retrieve and display the artist, album title, track list and some additional information.

It was originally based on the now-proprietary CDDB (Compact Disc DataBase). Because it inherited the CDDB limitations, there is no data field in the Freedb database for composer. This limits its usefulness for classical music CDs. Furthermore, CDs in a series are often introduced in the database by different people, resulting in inconsistent spelling and naming conventions across discs.  the database held just under 2,000,000 CDs. As of 2007, MusicBrainz – a project with similar goals – had a Freedb gateway that allowed access to their own database. The Freedb gateway was shut down on March 18, 2019.

History 
The original software behind CDDB was released under the GNU General Public License, and many people submitted CD information thinking the service would also remain free. The license was later changed, however, and some programmers complained that the new license included certain terms that they couldn't accept: if one wanted to access CDDB, one was not allowed to access any other CDDB-like database (such as Freedb), and any programs using a CDDB lookup had to display a CDDB logo while performing the lookup.

In March 2001, CDDB, now owned by Gracenote, banned all unlicensed applications from accessing their database. New licenses for CDDB1 (the original version of CDDB) were no longer available, since Gracenote wanted to force programmers to switch to CDDB2 (a new version incompatible with CDDB1 and hence with Freedb). The license change motivated the Freedb project, which is intended to remain free.

Freedb is used primarily by media players, cataloguers, audio taggers and CD ripper software. As of version 6 of the Freedb protocol, Freedb accepts and returns UTF-8 data.

Magix acquired Freedb in 2006.  MusicBrainz – a project with similar goals – released a Freedb gateway in 2007, allowing users to harvest information from the MusicBrainz database rather than Freedb. This service was shuttered in 2019.

Freedb.org and its services was scheduled to be shut down on March 31 of 2020. As of May 28, 2020 the site was still operational. On the 13th of June 2020 it was observed that the URL used for lookups, Freedb.Freedb.org, no longer resolved to a host name and as a result the service no longer appears to operate.

gnudb.org has continued to provide the Freedb.org database after Freedb.org was shutdown.

Client software 
Further Freedb aware applications include:

 Asunder
 Audiograbber
 CDex
 cdrdao
 Exact Audio Copy
 foobar2000
 fre:ac
 Grip
 JetAudio
 Mp3tag
 MediaMonkey
 puddletag
 Quod Libet

See also
 List of online music databases
 MusicBrainz

References

External links
  (archived copy)
 gnudb.org

Online music and lyrics databases
American music websites
Internet properties established in 2001
Free-content websites
Defunct American websites
Internet properties disestablished in 2020